Abu Abdallah Mohammed ibn Mohammed ibn Ali ibn Ahmed ibn Masoud ibn Hajj al-Abdari al-Hihi (fl. ca. 1289) was a Moroccan travel writer. He was born among the Haha, a Berber tribe in the south of Morocco. He is the author of The Moroccan Journey (Al-Rihlah al-magribiyyah), an account of his journey to Mecca in 1289, originally entitled Rihlat al-Abdari (al-Abdari's Journey). It was published by the Ministry of Education (ed. Muhammad al-Fasi, Rabat, 1968).)

The section of the al-Rihla al-Maghreibiyya describing places in Palestine was copied by Ibn Juzayy in 1354-1355 when writing an account of the travels of Ibn Battuta.

al-Abdari was also the grand Qadi (judge) of Marrakesh.

(He is not to be confused with Mohammed ibn Hajj al-Abdari al-Fasi or Mohammed Ibn Mohammed ibn Mohammed Abu Abdallah Ibn al-Hajj al-Abdari al-Qayrawani al-Fasi al-Tilamsi, (ca. 1258 - 1336), the author of Madkhal Ash-Shara Ash-Shareef Ala Al-Mathahib, or "Introduction to Islamic Jurisprudence According to Schools of Thought".)

References

Abdari, Muhammad ibn Muhammad. Rihlat al-'Abdari / ta'lif Abi 'Abd Allah Muhammad ibn Muhammad ibn 'Ali ibn Ahmad ibn Sa'ud al-'Abdari ; haqqaqaha wa-qaddama la-ha 'Ali Ibrahim Kurdi ; qaddama la-ha Shakir al-Fahham. al-Tab'ah, Damascus : Dar Sa'd al-Din, 1999. (editor's MA thesis)

Further reading

External links
For a biography see  (retrieved September 11, 2008) N.B. This site mistakenly assumes that the two authors are the same.

Moroccan writers
Moroccan travel writers
Berber Moroccans
13th-century Moroccan writers
People from Marrakesh

13th-century Berber people
Berber writers
13th-century Arabic writers
13th-century Moroccan judges
Travel writers of the medieval Islamic world